Evgeny Komarov (born 8 November 1988) is a Russian male BMX rider, representing his nation at international competitions. He competed in the time trial event at the 2015 UCI BMX World Championships.

References

External links
 
 
 
 

1988 births
Living people
BMX riders
Russian male cyclists
Olympic cyclists of Russia
Cyclists at the 2016 Summer Olympics
European Games competitors for Russia
Cyclists at the 2015 European Games
Place of birth missing (living people)
21st-century Russian people